Modernizing Medicine, Inc., is a United States software company headquartered at the Boca Raton Innovation Campus in Boca Raton, Florida. The company was founded in 2010 by Daniel Cane, CEO and co-founder of Blackboard, Inc., and Dr. Michael Sherling, Chief Medical and Strategy Officer and practicing dermatologist.

In addition to its headquarters in Boca Raton, the company also has offices in Roseville, California and Santiago, Chile.

The company offers electronic health records, practice management, revenue cycle management and data analytics for doctors, and currently has software for dermatologists, ophthalmologists, orthopedic surgeons, gastroenterologists, plastic surgeons, otolaryngologists, urologists and pain management physicians. As part of its business model, Modernizing Medicine employs practicing doctors to help program the software for each specialty.

The company has raised $332 million in funding. In 2017, the company received $231 million from private equity group Warburg Pincus. Modernizing Medicine acquired gMed, a healthcare IT company serving gastroenterologists, in 2015.

References 

American companies established in 2010
2010 establishments in Florida
Companies based in Boca Raton, Florida
Medical and health organizations based in Florida
Software companies based in Florida
Software companies of the United States
Software companies established in 2010